Palaquium xanthochymum is a tree in the family Sapotaceae. The specific epithet xanthochymum means "yellow latex".

Description
Inflorescences bear up to five flowers. The timber is used for boat-building.

Distribution and habitat
Palaquium xanthochymum is found in Sumatra, Peninsular Malaysia, Java and Borneo. Its habitat is mixed swamp and dipterocarp forests from sea level to  altitude.

References

xanthochymum
Trees of Sumatra
Trees of Peninsular Malaysia
Trees of Borneo
Trees of Java
Plants described in 1860